"" is a song by Pātea Māori Club. Originally included in the band's 1987 debut album Poi E, it was released as a single in 1988. A Māori language pop/Gospel song, it was written as a tribute to lyricist Ngoi Pēwhairangi by Dalvanius Prime and people from her community in Tokomaru Bay who were close to her. The single did not chart in the top 40 singles in New Zealand, however was nominated for Best Polynesian Album at the 1988 New Zealand Music Awards.

Background and composition

Songwriter and producer Dalvanius Prime wanted to create tribute song for lyricist Ngoi Pēwhairangi, who had worked on the group's previous singles and passed away in early 1988. The song was written in collaboration with people from Pēwhairangi's community in Tokomaru Bay, each writing one line that represented how they felt about Pēwhairangi. Songwriter and producer Dalvanius Prime felt that these lyrics were too sad, so was inspired to create an upbeat Gospel inspired song that would celebrate her life, while keeping the original lyrics.

The song features a spoken introduction by American radio show host Imhotep Gary Byrd from WLIB. It was recorded at Marmalade Studios in Wellington, unlike all other songs from the Poi E album, which had been recorded in Auckland. Vocalists who feature on the song include Annie Crummer, who at the time was a member of the band When the Cat's Away, Moana Maniapoto Jackson, who Prime worked with on a Māori language anti-drink driving song "Kua Makona", and Cara Pewhairangi, Ngoi's niece, who he had worked with for the song "Haere Mai" for the soundtrack of the 1987 film Ngati.

The song was issued as a single in 1988, after the release of the Poi E album. The single was nominated for Best Polynesian Album at the 1988 New Zealand Music Awards, however lost to the group's own Poi E album. The group performed the song on television in 1992, on the magazine show New Zealand Today.

In 2019, the group Tiniwhetū, a group composed of members of the Māori Television Pūkana, released a cover of the song which featured Pēwhairangi's granddaughter, Te Aomihia Pēwhairangi.

Track listing

NZ 7-inch single
"Ngoi Ngoi"
"Ngoi Ngoi (Instrumental)"

Credits and personnel
Credits adapted from the Poi E album booklet.

Gary Byrd – introduction
Annie Crummer – additional vocals
Dave Dobbyn – video appearance
Dale Ferris – additional vocals
Lee Fox – lyrics
Martha Fox – lyrics
Tui Fox – lyrics
David Ginnane – co-producer, engineer, mixer
Ada Haige – lyrics
Ngaro Herewini – lyrics
Moana Maniapoto Jackson – additional vocals
Ara Kopua – lyrics
Wikitoria Matahiki – lyrics
Dave Parsons – arrangement, Drumulator
Cara Pewhairangi – additional vocals
Taite Pewhairangi – lyrics
Dalvanius Prime – arrangement, producer, songwriter
Noel Raihania – lyrics
Ropata Smith – arrangement, keyboards
Tokomaru Bay Co-op – songwriter
Rob Winch – arrangement, guitar

References

1988 singles
1987 songs
Māori-language songs
New Zealand songs
Commemoration songs
Pātea Māori Club songs
Song recordings produced by Dalvanius Prime